Yolanda Chen (born July 26, 1961 in Moscow) is a retired Russian athlete. She started as a pentathlete, but decided to specialize in long jump. In 1988, she achieved a personal best of 7.16 metres, a good result, but from 1992 she switched to triple jump instead, a relatively new event for women. Inspired by her father Yevgeniy Chen, who was among the world elite in the 1950s, she managed to jump 13.72 metres in 1992. Her great-grandfather was Eugene Chen.

In 1993, she improved to 14.97 metres, a new outdoor record which would also remain her personal best. Her record was beaten at the World Championships the same year by fellow Russian Anna Biryukova, who jumped 15.09m. In 1995, Chen appeared at the World Indoor Championships and won the gold medal with 15.03 metres, a new world indoor record, beating the prior record of 14.47m. She finished 11th at the World Championships the same year.

Chen married pole vaulter Yevgeniy Bondarenko. She now works as a commentator for the Russian Eurosport.

In 2023, she suggested postponing the 2024 Summer Olympics to 2025 because of controversies surrounding Russia's participation.

International competitions

See also
List of World Athletics Championships medalists (women)
List of IAAF World Indoor Championships medalists (women)
List of European Athletics Indoor Championships medalists (women)

References

 
IAAF bio

1961 births
Living people
Athletes from Moscow
Russian sports journalists
Soviet female long jumpers
Soviet female triple jumpers
Russian female triple jumpers
Russian female long jumpers
Universiade gold medalists in athletics (track and field)
Universiade gold medalists for the Soviet Union
Medalists at the 1989 Summer Universiade
World Athletics Championships athletes for Russia
World Athletics Championships medalists
World Athletics Indoor Championships winners
Russian Athletics Championships winners
Russian sportspeople of Chinese descent
Russian people of Chinese descent